Corkscrew Swamp Sanctuary is a National Audubon Society sanctuary located in southwest Florida, north of Naples, Florida and east of Bonita Springs, in the United States. The sanctuary was established to protect one of the largest remaining stands of bald cypress (Taxodium distichum) and pond cypress (T. ascendens) in North America from extensive logging that was ongoing throughout the 1940s and 1950s.

History

The Corkscrew Cypress Rookery Association was formed in 1954 to protect the area. The National Audubon Society accepted responsibility for management and started constructing the first boardwalk through the swamp in 1955.

In 2018, researchers at the Sanctuary determined that beginning around the year 2000, the amount of groundwater in the park began to diminish.  Records have been kept of water levels beginning in 1957, and analysis determined that previous changes in the landscape – such as the building of Immokalee Road, the use of canals to drain land for real estate development, the increase in agriculture in the area, the installation of electrical and telephone lines, or the paving over of neighboring wetlands – had not altered the water levels, which are measured at Lettuce Lake, the park's deepest standing water.  But since 2000 or 2001, despite the same amount of annual rainfall during the wet season, during the dry season the water now drains away quickly instead of slowly receding as it had done in the past. The cause of the change is unknown – there was no major topographical change at the time – but the cause and the effects of the drier dry season for the Sanctuary and surrounding Collier County are under investigation.

Park offerings and amenities
A boardwalk of a little over  length provides walking access through pine flatwoods, wet prairie, stands of pond cypress and bald cypress, and marsh ecosystems within the sanctuary. In 2017, some parts of the boardwalk were damaged by bald cypress trees knocked over by Hurricane Irma.  Most of the damage was repaired, but several small sections have been permanently closed.

The sanctuary is a gateway site for the Great Florida Birding Trail. It is an important breeding area for the endangered wood stork and other wetland birds. It also has wintering passerines, including the painted bunting. Numerous wading bird species can be found in the wetlands of the sanctuary, including the yellow-crowned night heron, black-crowned night heron, tricolored heron, great egret, and snowy egret.  Specialist birds include limpkin, barred owl and, in summer, swallow-tailed kite.

American alligators and cottonmouth snakes are also inhabitants of the sanctuary.

The sanctuary visitor center is a Living Machine demonstration site.

Gallery

References
Notes

Further reading

External links

Corkscrew Swamp Online Picture Tour

Nature reserves in Florida
National Natural Landmarks in Florida
Swamps of Florida
Nature centers in Florida
Protected areas of Collier County, Florida
National Audubon Society
Ramsar sites in the United States
Landforms of Collier County, Florida
1954 establishments in Florida
Protected areas established in 1954